The 2022 WAC women's basketball tournament was the postseason women's basketball tournament for the Western Athletic Conference during the 2021–22 season. All games were played at Orleans Arena in Paradise, Nevada, from March 8 to 12, 2022. Regular-season champion Stephen F. Austin, in its first WAC season after moving from the Southland Conference following the 2020–21 season, also won the tournament, receiving the WAC's automatic bid to the 2022 NCAA tournament.

Seeds
Eleven of the 13 teams in the WAC were eligible to compete in the conference tournament. Dixie State and Tarleton were ineligible due to their transitions from Division II to Division I. Teams were seeded by record within the conference, with a tiebreaker system to seed teams with identical conference records. Only the top 10 teams in the conference qualified for the tournament.

Schedule

Bracket 

* denotes overtime period

See also 

 Western Athletic Conference women's basketball tournament
 Western Athletic Conference

References

WAC women's basketball tournament
2021–22 Western Athletic Conference women's basketball season
Basketball competitions in the Las Vegas Valley
College basketball tournaments in Nevada
2022 in sports in Nevada
Women's sports in Nevada
College sports tournaments in Nevada